Arche , also known as , is a moon of Jupiter. It was discovered by a team of astronomers from the University of Hawaii led by Scott S. Sheppard on 31 October 2002, and received the temporary designation .

Arche is about 3 kilometres in diameter, and orbits Jupiter at an average distance of 23,717,000 km in 746.185 days, at an inclination of 165° to the ecliptic (162° to Jupiter's equator), in a retrograde direction and with an eccentricity of 0.149.

It was named in 2005 after Arche, whom some Greek writers described as one of the four original Muses, an addition to the earlier three (Aoede, Melete, and Mneme).

Arche belongs to the Carme group, made up of irregular retrograde moons orbiting Jupiter at a distance ranging between 23 and 24 Gm and at an inclination of about 165°.

References

Carme group
Moons of Jupiter
Irregular satellites
Discoveries by Scott S. Sheppard
Astronomical objects discovered in 2002
Moons with a retrograde orbit